The following is a list of at least 18 Sanskrit universities in India (3 central, 1 deemed and 14 state universities) which are only focused on Sanskrit revival and Sanskrit studies along with related disciplines like Ayurveda.

See also
 List of Sanskrit academic institutes outside India

References

 
Sanskrit
Hinduism-related lists
Indology
Indosphere
Sanskrit universities
Sanskrit revival